Raed Abdullah Al-Ghamdi (born 6 May 1994) is a professional footballer who plays for Al-Raed as a forward .

Career statistics

Club

Honours
Al-Ahli
Saudi Professional League: 2015–16
King Cup: 2016
Saudi Super Cup: 2016

Al-Nassr
Saudi Super Cup: 2020

References

External links 
 

1994 births
Living people
Sportspeople from Jeddah
Association football forwards
Saudi Arabian footballers
Saudi Arabia youth international footballers
Saudi Arabia international footballers
Al-Ahli Saudi FC players
Khaleej FC players
Ohod Club players
Al Batin FC players
Al-Raed FC players
Al Nassr FC players
Saudi Professional League players
Footballers at the 2014 Asian Games
Asian Games competitors for Saudi Arabia
20th-century Saudi Arabian people
21st-century Saudi Arabian people